Sciota uvinella, the sweetgum leafroller moth, is a species of snout moth in the genus Sciota. It was described by Ragonot in 1887. It is found in North America, where it has been recorded from New Jersey to Florida, west to Texas and Kentucky.

The forewings are a mix of pale grey, dull reddish-brown and dark grey to blackish bands. There is a double dark discal spot in the median area and the terminal line consists of a series of dark dashes. The hindwings are light brownish-grey. Adults are on wing from April to September.

The larvae feed on Liquidambar styraciflua.

References

Moths described in 1887
Phycitini
Moths of North America